Darren Mallory Sharper (born November 3, 1975) is an American convicted serial rapist and a former football safety who played in the National Football League (NFL) for 14 seasons. He played college football at William & Mary and was selected in the second round of the 1997 NFL Draft by the Green Bay Packers, where he spent eight seasons. Sharper played his next four seasons with the Minnesota Vikings, while his final two seasons were as a member of the New Orleans Saints. Recognized as one of the league's top defensive backs during his career, Sharper was a five-time Pro Bowl selection and a two-time first-team All-Pro, along with being named to the second-team of the 2000s All-Decade Team. He ranks sixth in interceptions and is tied with Charles Woodson and Rod Woodson for the most defensive touchdowns.

Following Sharper's 2010 retirement, allegations surfaced that he drugged and raped several women across various states, leading to him being charged in 2014. Sharper pled guilty to the rape and drug-related charges and was sentenced in 2016 to 20 years in prison. As a result of his guilty plea, he was removed from the William & Mary Athletics Hall of Fame, while debate has loomed over whether his Pro Football Hall of Fame eligibility should be disqualified.

Early years
Sharper has an older sister, Monica, and an older brother, Jamie. The Sharpers attended Hermitage High School in Henrico County, Virginia. Jamie played for the high school football team as a linebacker. Darren played for the varsity football and basketball teams. He was named to the honor roll, had perfect attendance in three of his four years, and was active in the foreign language club and student council. Hermitage honored Sharper with a display on their "Wall of Fame". Sharper graduated from Hermitage in 1993.

College career
Sharper attended the College of William and Mary, where he played for the William & Mary Tribe football team.  In high school, Sharper primarily played quarterback. He wanted to be a quarterback at William & Mary, as well. The college coach, Jimmye Laycock, hinted to him that, as an alternative, Sharper might join the NFL (as a defensive back). During his college career, he earned All-America honors twice and was named first-team All-Yankee Conference selection three times. As a senior in 1996, he was the Yankee Conference Defensive Player of the Year after intercepting 10 passes for a season. He finished his college career with a school record 24 career interceptions and a I-AA record 468 career interception return yards.  He also set the school record with 1,027 career punt return yards.

Professional career

Green Bay Packers
The Green Bay Packers selected Sharper in the second round (60th overall) of the 1997 NFL Draft. Sharper was the fifth safety drafted in 1997 and his brother, Jamie Sharper, was also selected in the second round (34th overall).

1997
During training camp, Sharper competed to be the starting free safety against veteran Eugene Robinson. Head coach Mike Holmgren officially named Sharper the backup free safety, behind Eugene Robinson, to begin the regular season.

He made his professional regular season debut in the Green Bay Packers' season-opening 38–24 win against the Chicago Bears. On September 21, 1997, Sharper made his first career tackle during a 38–32 win against the Minnesota Vikings in Week 4. On November 2, 1997, Sharper made one tackle and returned his first career interception for his first touchdown during a 20–10 loss to the Detroit Lions in Week 10. Sharper made his first career interception off a pass by Lions' quarterback Scott Mitchell and returned it for a 50-yard touchdown in the second quarter. In Week 13, he recorded a season-high two combined tackles and returned a fumble recovery for a 34-yard touchdown during a 45–17 win against the Dallas Cowboys. On December 30, 1997, Sharper made two combined tackles, forced a fumble, and returned an interception for his third defensive touchdown of the season as the Packers defeated the Buffalo Bills 31–21 in Week 17. Sharper intercepted a pass by Buffalo Bills' quarterback Alex Van Pelt and returned it for a 20-yard touchdown to seal the Packers' victory in the fourth quarter. Sharper broke the Green Bay Packers franchise record for most defensive touchdowns by a rookie which stood for 64 years. He also tied the franchises record for most defensive touchdowns that was set by Herb Adderley in 1964. He finished his rookie season in 1997 with three defensive touchdowns, two interceptions and a fumble recovery in 14 games and zero starts. 

The Green Bay Packers finished first in the NFC Central with a 13–3 record and earned a first round bye. On January 4, 1998, Sharper played in his first career playoff game and recorded three combined tackles in the Packers' 21–7 victory against the Tampa Bay Buccaneers in the NFC Divisional Round. The Packers reached Super Bowl XXXII after they defeated the San Francisco 49ers 23–10 in the NFC Championship Game. On January 25, 1998, Sharper appeared in Super Bowl XXXII as the Packers lost to the Denver Broncos 31–24 and failed to repeat as Super Bowl Champions.

1998
Sharper entered training camp slated as the starting free safety in 1998. Head coach Mike Holmgren officially named Sharper the starting free safety to begin the regular season, alongside strong safety LeRoy Butler. He made his first career start in the Green Bay Packers' season-opener against the Detroit Lions and made three combined tackles in their 38–19 victory. On October 15, 1998, he collected a season-high ten combined tackles during a 27–20 loss at the Detroit Lions in Week 7. He started in all 16 games in 1998 and recorded 73 combined tackles. The Green Bay Packers finished the 1998 season  second in the NFC Central with an 11–5 record and earned a playoff berth. On January 13, 1998, Sharper started his first career playoff game and recorded four combined tackles, deflected a pass, made a sack, forced a fumble, and made an interception during the Packers' 25–15 victory at the San Francisco 49ers in the NFC Wildcard Game.

1999
On January 8, 1999, it was announced that head coach Mike Holmgren had accepted the general manager/head coaching position with the Seattle Seahawks. On January 12, 1999, the Green Bay Packers hired Philadelphia Eagles' head coach Ray Rhodes as the new head coach for the 1999 season. Defensive coordinator Emmitt Thomas retained Sharper and LeRoy Butler as the starting safeties to start the regular season. On November 14, 1999, Sharper recorded 11 combined tackles and made his first career sack on quarterback Jason Garrett during a 27–13 loss at the Dallas Cowboys in Week 10. On December 26, 1999, Sharper collected a season-high 12 combined tackles during a 29–10 loss at the Tampa Bay Buccaneers in Week 16. He started in all 16 games for the second consecutive season and finished the 1999 season with a career-high 113 combined tackles and three interceptions.

2000
On January 2, 2000, the Green Bay Packers fired head coach Ray Rhodes and his coaching staff after they failed to qualify for the playoffs and finished with an 8–8 record. On January 17, 2000, the Green Bay Packers announced the hiring of Seattle Seahawks' offensive coordinator Mike Sherman as their new general manager/head coach. Sherman previously held the tight ends coaching positional from 1997 to 1999. Sharper and LeRoy Butler returned as the Packers' starting safeties for the third consecutive season, but their first under new defensive coordinator Ed Donatell. On September 24, 2000, Sharper collected a season-high ten combined tackles and intercepted two passes by Cardinals' quarterback Jake Plummer during a 29–3 victory at the Arizona Cardinals in Week 4. In Week 10, he recorded seven combined tackles and intercepted two pass attempts by quarterback Daunte Culpepper in the Packers' 26–20 win against the Minnesota Vikings. On December 14, 2000, it was announced that Sharper was selected to play in the 2001 Pro Bowl as part of the NFC roster, marking the first Pro Bowl selection of his career. He started in all 16 games in 2000 and recorded 92 combined tackles, one sack, and led the entire league with nine interceptions.

2001
On February 21, 2001, the Green Bay Packers signed Sharper to a six-year, $30 million contract that includes a signing bonus of $7 million.

Head coach Mike Sherman retained Sharper and LeRoy Butler as the starting safety duo in 2001. He started in the Green Bay Packers' season-opener against the Detroit Lions and recorded four solo tackles, deflected two passes, and intercepted two passes by quarterback Charlie Batch in their 28–6 victory. On October 4, 2001, he made ten combined tackles (eight solo), two pass deflections, and an interception in 31–23 win against the Baltimore Ravens in Week 5. In Week 14, Sharper collected a season-high ten combined tackles (nine solo) during a 26–20 loss at the Tennessee Titans. Sharper started in all 16 games in 2001 and recorded 94 combined tackles (70 solo), 17 pass deflections, six interceptions, two sacks, and a forced fumble.

The Green Bay Packers finished second in the NFC Central with a 12–4 record. On January 13, 2002, Sharper made nine combined tackles, deflected a pass, and made a sack in a 25–15 win against the San Francisco 49ers in the NFC Wildcard Game. The following week,  he made seven combined tackles, a pass deflection, and intercepted a pass by quarterback Kurt Warner during a 45–17 loss at the St. Louis Rams in the NFC Divisional Round.

2002
Head coach Mike Sherman named Sharper the starting free safety to begin the regular season, alongside strong safety Marques Anderson. This became Sharpers' first season without LeRoy Butler who retired due to a shoulder injury. Sharper was inactive for two games (Weeks 6–7) due to a hamstring injury. On November 4, 2002, Sharper recorded seven combined tackles, deflected two passes, and returned an interception for a touchdown as the Packers defeated the Miami Dolphins 24–10 in Week 7. Sharper intercepted a pass by Dolphins' quarterback Ray Lucas and returned it for an 89-yard touchdown in the third quarter. In Week 15, he collected a season-high eight combined tackles during a 20–14 win at the San Francisco 49ers. He was sidelined during the Packers' Week 17 loss at the New York Jets after injuring his hamstring the previous week. On December 19, 2002, Sharper was announced as a 2003 Pro Bowl selection. He finished the 2002 season with 68 combined tackles (51 solo), seven interceptions, two pass deflections, and a touchdown in 13 games and 13 starts.

2003
Sharper returned as the starting free safety in his fourth year under defensive coordinator Ed Donatell. He was paired with strong safety Antuan Edwards and played alongside cornerbacks Al Harris and Mike McKenzie. On September 21, 2003, he collected a season-high nine combined tackles during the Packers' 20–13 loss at the Arizona Cardinals in Week 3. The following week, he recorded six solo tackles and made a career-high two sacks on Bears' quarterback Kordell Stewart in a 38–23 win at the Chicago Bears in Week 4. In Week 15, he tied his season-high of nine combined tackles, deflected a pass, and returned an interception by quarterback Drew Brees for a 50-yard gain during a 38–21 win at the San Diego Chargers. Sharper finished the 2003 season with 82 combined tackles (69 solo), 13 pass deflections, five interceptions, two sacks, and two forced fumbles in 15 games and 15 starts.

The Green Bay Packers finished first in the NFC North with a 10–6 record. On January 4, 2004, Sharper recorded 11 combined tackles (nine solo) in the Packers' 33–27 overtime victory in the NFC Wildcard Game against the Seattle Seahawks and led by his former head coach Mike Holmgren. The following week, he made eight combined tackles, deflected two passes, and recorded a sack during a 20–17 overtime loss at the Philadelphia Eagles in the NFC Divisional Round.

2004
On January 16, 2004, head coach Mike Sherman announced the dismissal of defensive coordinator Ed Donatell after the Packers' defense ranked 17th in 2003 and allowed the Philadelphia Eagles to convert on fourth and 26th in the NFC Divisional Round. Sherman elected to promote defensive backs coach Bob Slowik to defensive coordinator. Sharper was retained as the starting free safety in 2003, but was paired with strong safety Mark Roman.

On September 26, 2004, Sharper collected a season-high nine combined tackles in a 45–31 loss at the Indianapolis Colts in Week 3. On October 17, 2004, he made four combined tackles, broke up a pass, and returned an interception for a touchdown during a 38–10 victory at the Detroit Lions. Sharper intercepted a pass by Lions' quarterback Joey Harrington and returned it for a 36-yard touchdown in the third quarter. Sharper was inactive for the Packers' Week 8 victory at the Washington Redskins due to an injury to his shin. In Week 15, he recorded six combined tackles and returned a fumble recovery for a 15-yard touchdown in the second quarter of a 28–25 loss to the Jacksonville Jaguars in Week 15. In Week 17, Sharper recorded five combined tackles, deflected a pass, and returned an interception by Chad Hutchinson for a 43-yard touchdown in the second quarter of the Packers' 31–14 win at the Chicago Bears. He finished the 2004 season with 70 combined tackles (57 solo), seven pass deflections, four interceptions, three interceptions, two forced fumbles, and a fumble recovery. He tied the franchise record of three defensive touchdowns he set in his rookie season in 1997.

2005
On January 24, 2005, the Green Bay Packers replaced defensive coordinator Bob Slowik with Jim Bates. On March 10, 2005, the Green Bay Packers released Sharper after he declined to take a pay cut. The Packers avoided paying him a $2.60 million roster bonus and cleared $3.40 million in salary cap space by releasing him. He finished his eight-year career in Green Bay ranked fifth with 36 interceptions. He also recorded 616 combined tackles, six sacks, and 677 interception return yards.

Minnesota Vikings
On March 12, 2005, the Minnesota Vikings signed Sharper to a four-year, $10.60 million contract that includes a signing bonus $4 million.

Sharper entered training camp slated as the starting free safety. Head coach Mike Tice officially named Sharper the starter to begin the regular season, along with strong safety Corey Chavous and cornerbacks Fred Smoot and Brian Williams.

He started in the Minnesota Vikings' season-opener against the Tampa Bay Buccaneers and collected a season-high nine combined tackles, deflected two passes, forces a fumble, and returned an interception for a touchdown during a 24–13 loss. Sharper intercepted a pass by quarterback Brian Griese and returned it for an 88-yard touchdown in the first quarter. He was sidelined for two games (Weeks 3–4) after injuring his quadriceps. On November 13, 2005, Sharper recorded four combined tackles, deflected five passes, made a career-high three interceptions, and returned an interception for a touchdown during a 24–21 win at the New York Giants in Week 10. Sharper intercepted a pass by Giants' quarterback Eli Manning and returned it for a 92-yard touchdown in the first quarter. On December 20, 2005, it was announced that Sharper was selected to the 2006 Pro Bowl. He finished his first season with the Minnesota Vikings with a total of 51 combined tackles (41 solo), 16 pass deflections, tied his career-high of nine interceptions, forced a fumble, and scored two touchdowns in 14 games and 14 starts.

2006
On January 2, 2006, the Minnesota Vikings fired head coach Mike Tice after they finished with a 9–7 record in 2005. On January 6, 2006, the Minnesota Vikings announced the hiring of former Philadelphia Eagles' offensive coordinator Brad Childress as their new head coach. Defensive coordinator Mike Tomlin installed the Tampa 2 defense and chose to move Sharper to strong safety. Head coach Brad Childress named Shaper the starting strong safety to begin the regular season, alongside free safety Tank Williams. Dwight Smith replaced Williams to begin the regular season due to an injury.

In Week 8, he collected a season-high seven solo tackles, deflected a pass, and made an interception during a 31–7 loss to the New England Patriots. On November 11, 2006, in a game against the Miami Dolphins, Sharper bumped a member of the officiating crew, but he was not immediately penalized, later the following week the NFL fined him $15,000 for the infraction. On December 17, 2006, he collected a season-high eight combined tackles during a 26–13 loss to the New York Jets in Week 15. He started in all 16 games in 2006 and recorded 67 combined tackles (55 solo), nine pass deflections, four interceptions, and a sack.

2007
On February 8, 2007, the Minnesota Vikings hired Indianapolis Colts' defensive backs coach Leslie Frazier to be the new defensive coordinator after Mike Tomlin accepted the head coaching position with the Pittsburgh Steelers. Frazier opted to run the Tampa 2 defense and retained Sharper and Dwight as the starting safeties in 2007.

On September 16, 2007, Sharper collected a season-high eight solo tackles, deflected two passes, and made two interceptions during a 20–17 overtime loss at the Detroit Lions in Week 2. His two interceptions brought his career total to 50 and earned him the distinction as the 22nd player to surpass 50 interceptions. In Week 12, he made two solo tackles, broke up a pass, and returned an interception for a touchdown in the Vikings' 41–17 win at the New York Giants. Sharper intercepted a pass by quarterback Eli Manning and returned it for a 20-yard touchdown in the first quarter. On December 18, 2007, Sharper was announced as a 2008 Pro Bowl selection. He started in all 16 games in 2007 and recorded 63 combined tackles (49 solo), eight pass deflections, four interceptions, and a forced fumble.

2008
Head coach Brad Childress named Sharper the starting strong safety to begin the 2008 season, alongside free safety Madieu Williams. In Week 14, he collected a season-high eight solo tackles during a 20–16 win at the Detroit Lions. Sharper started in all 16 games for the third consecutive season and recorded 69 combined tackles (60 solo), five pass deflections, and an interception. He finished his four-year career in Minnesota with 18 interceptions, 250 tackles, 359 interception yards, three touchdowns, and a sack.

New Orleans Saints

2009
On March 18, 2009, the New Orleans Saints signed Sharper to a one-year, $1.20 million contract. Throughout training camp, Sharper competed to be the starting free safety against Usama Young. Head coach Sean Payton named Sharper the starting free safety to begin regular season, alongside strong safety Roman Harper and cornerbacks Jabari Greer and Tracy Porter.

He started in the New Orleans Saints' season-opener against the Detroit Lions and recorded one tackle, deflected two passes, and made two interceptions off pass attempts by quarterback Matthew Stafford during a 45–27 victory. The following week, Sharper recorded three solo tackles, broke up a pass, and returned an interception by quarterback Kevin Kolb for a 97-yard touchdown during the fourth quarter of a 48–22 win at the Philadelphia Eagles in Week 2. On October 4, 2009, Sharper made nine combined tackles, two pass deflections, two interceptions, and a touchdown during a 24–10 win against the New York Jets in Week 4. Sharper intercepted a pass by Jets' quarterback Mark Sanchez and returned it for a 99-yard touchdown in the second quarter. The return for touchdown became his second 95+ yard interception return of the season. In Week 7, Sharper made four combined tackles, broke up a pass, and returned an interception by Chad Henne for a 42-yard touchdown during a 46–34 win at the Miami Dolphins. Sharper was inactive for the Saints' Week 10 victory at the St. Louis Rams after straining his left knee. On December 27, 2009, Sharper made seven combined tackles, two pass deflections, and returned an interception by Josh Freeman for a 21-yard gain during a 20–17 loss to the Tampa Bay Buccaneers in Week 16. The 21-yard interception brought his season return yards to 376-yards and earned him the record for most interception return yards in a single season. He surpassed Ed Reed who set the record in 2004. It was the 63rd interception of Sharper's NFL career, tying him for sixth on the all-time list. On December 29, 2009, it was announced that Sharper was selected to play in the 2010 Pro Bowl. Sharper finished the season with 71 combined tackles (51 solo), 15 pass deflections, nine interceptions, three touchdowns, and was credited with half a sack in 14 games and 14 starts.

The New Orleans Saints finished first in the NFC South with a 13–3 record and earned a first round bye. They defeated the Arizona Cardinals 45–14 in the NFC Divisional Round. On January 24, 2010, Sharper recorded 11 combined tackles (seven solo) as the Saints defeated the Minnesota Vikings 31–28 in the NFC Championship Game. On February 7, 2010, Sharper started in Super Bowl XLIV and   made three combined tackles during a 31–17 victory against the Indianapolis Colts. The game was decided when cornerback Tracy Porter intercepted a Peyton Manning pass late in the fourth quarter and returned it 74-yards for the game-winning touchdown.

2010
During the offseason, Shaper underwent micro-fracture arthroscopic surgery on his left knee. On March 5, 2010, Sharper became an unrestricted free agent and went on a visit with the Jacksonville Jaguars. On May 3, 2010, the New Orleans Saints signed Sharper to a one-year, $2.25 million contract with a signing bonus of $75,000. Throughout training camp, Sharper competed to retain his position as the starting free safety against Malcolm Jenkins who was converted from cornerback.

On September 3, Sharper was placed on the physically unable to perform (PUP) list, causing him to miss the first six weeks of the 2010 NFL season.  He was activated on October 24, but he later missed another two games after a further injury. Sharper finished the 2010 season with 16 combined tackles (11 solo) and a pass deflection in eight games and one start. He was selected as a second-team All Pro, despite having missed much of the season.

Free agency
After workouts with the Denver Broncos, New England Patriots, and Green Bay Packers without a contract offer, Sharper reportedly announced his retirement after a 14-year career.  He finished with 63 career regular season interceptions, placing him sixth all time.  He took 11 of them back for touchdowns, which ranks him tied for second with Charles Woodson and only behind Hall of Famer Rod Woodson, with 12.  Sharper's 13 career defensive touchdowns (11 interception returns, two fumble returns) is tied for first in NFL history with Woodson and Woodson.

Hall of Fame consideration
On April 13, 2015, Sharper was removed from the William & Mary Athletics Hall of Fame.

In 2016, he became eligible for induction into the Pro Football Hall of Fame, leading to a debate as to whether his criminal convictions disqualify him. Sports Illustrated writer Peter King, who is on the Hall of Fame voting committee, has said that Sharper must be considered because voters are prohibited from taking off-field issues into account.

Post-playing career
In August 2012, after retiring, Sharper worked briefly for WWL-TV as an analyst before leaving to take a position with NFL Network. On February 28, 2014, Sharper was officially fired from NFL Network in connection with his arrest for aggravated rape.

NFL career statistics

Regular season

Convictions of rape and drug distribution

Allegations
On March 18, 2011, two women filed a criminal complaint against Sharper with the Miami Beach Police Department alleging they were possibly sexually assaulted after passing out at Sharper's condo on his couch and waking up to find their underwear missing. The women were in Miami for spring break and were students from the University of Georgia. On March 17, 2011, the women had been brought to Sharper's condo by a mutual friend, nightclub promoter Wascar Payano, and had passed out on Sharper's couch. One of the women claimed she woke up to a man attempting to place his penis in her mouth, but pushed the man away. She alleged when she woke up again a man was lifting her dress. She immediately woke up her friend and told Payano about the incident. Both women discovered their underwear was missing and were taken to the hospital by Payano where they underwent rape examination. On March 23, 2011, Miami Beach Police Department closed the investigation five days after the incident. The Miami Beach Police Department's records show no evidence the detective in charge of the case sent the rape kits for a detailed examination, had spoken to Darren Sharper, or had visited Sharper's condo where the alleged assault had taken place.
On February 2, 2013, Sharper allegedly helped drug a woman who was working as a model at a pre-Super Bowl party in New Orleans and was consequently raped by Sharper's friend Brandon Licciardi. 
On August 31, 2013, Sharper allegedly raped a woman in New Orleans.
On September 23, 2013, Sharper allegedly drugged two women in New Orleans and raped them with his accomplice, Erik Nunez. One of the victims filed a report with the New Orleans Police Department. Sharper and his friend, Erik Nunez, raped the women.
On October 30, 2013, Sharper allegedly drugged two women and raped one of the women in Los Angeles after meeting them in a West Hollywood night club and bringing them back to his hotel room. On November 7, 2013, the victim filed a police report with the Los Angeles Police Department.
On November 20, 2013, Sharper allegedly met three female Arizona State University students in Tempe, Arizona and raped two of them after drugging them. Both women immediately underwent assault examinations within 12 hours of the assault and filed a police report with the Tempe Police Department.
On January 14, 2014, Sharper allegedly met two women in West Hollywood night clubs and proceeded to take them to his hotel room, drug them, and raped one of them. Both victims reported the incident to the Los Angeles Police Department and underwent rape examinations.
On January 15, 2014, Sharper allegedly met two women and a man in a nightclub in Las Vegas and drugged all three. He proceeded to take the women to his hotel room and sexually assaulted them both.

Prosecutions

California state
On January 17, 2014, Sharper was arrested in Los Angeles on two separate counts of sexual assault. The alleged incidents were said to have happened in October 2013 and January 2014.

On February 14, 2014, Sharper was officially charged with two counts of rape, by use of drugs, and five related felony counts. Sharper was released on $200,000 bond, which at the request of the prosecution was raised to $1,000,000. Sharper pleaded not guilty to the charges. Conditions of his bail required him not to frequent any drinking establishment, as well as not to be alone with any women he had no relationship with prior to October 13, 2013, the date of his first alleged rape under these charges. Sharper faced up to 30 years in prison if convicted of all counts.

Louisiana state and federal
In January 2014, USA Today reported the New Orleans Police Department was investigating a sexual assault allegation against Sharper which was filed on September 24, 2013.

Officials in Orleans Parish, Louisiana, filed two charges of aggravated rape against Sharper and another two counts against Erik Nunez, 26, on February 27, 2014, related to the alleged September 2013 incident in New Orleans. Investigators said a second woman came forward with a complaint following an initial report shortly after the alleged rape.  WDSU noted, "Louisiana law states that a person convicted of committing aggravated rape shall be punished by life imprisonment at hard labor without benefit of parole, probation or suspension of sentence." Also on February 27, 2014, Sharper surrendered to the police in Los Angeles after an arrest warrant was issued by the authorities in Louisiana.

On December 12, 2014, an Orleans Parish grand jury indicted Sharper on two counts of aggravated rape, stating that, if convicted, he will face a mandatory life sentence. On the same day, a federal grand jury in the US District Court for the Eastern District of Louisiana returned an indictment for conspiracy to distribute a controlled substance (1 count) and distribution of a controlled substance (2 counts).

Arizona state
On March 12, 2014, Sharper was charged with sexual assault in Arizona. Under Arizona state law, a person commits sexual assault by knowingly engaging in sexual intercourse or oral sexual contact with another person without that person's consent. No consent was given if the victim was incapable of consenting by reason of drugs, alcohol, sleep, or a similar impairment, and such impairment was known or should have been known to the defendant.

Nevada state
On March 20, 2015, Sharper was charged with two sexual assaults in Las Vegas. The purported crimes took place in January 2014 and involved two women. Nevada state legislation provides that a person subjecting another person to sexual penetration against that person's will, or under conditions in which the perpetrator knows
or should know that the victim is mentally or physically incapable of resisting or understanding the nature of the perpetrator's conduct, is guilty of sexual assault. The notion of sexual penetration includes sexual intercourse in its ordinary meaning.

Guilty pleas and sentencing

California and Arizona
Later on March 20, Sharper's lawyer said that Sharper had reached a plea agreement to resolve all of the charges against him. He appeared in court in Los Angeles on March 23 to enter guilty pleas to sexual assault in Arizona, by video-conferencing, and no contest in California to raping two women he knocked out with a potent sedative mixed with alcohol. The Arizona judge sentenced him immediately to nine years in prison, with no chance for early release.

On November 29, 2016, Sharper was sentenced to 20 years in prison by Los Angeles County Superior Court Judge Michael Pastor. Sharper's plea deal allows serving half that time, minus time already served. As a non-violent criminal, Sharper might also be eligible for parole since raping an intoxicated person is a non-violent crime in the state of California.

Nevada
On March 24, 2015, Sharper pleaded guilty to a single count of attempted sexual assault on two women in Las Vegas. He agreed to serve three to eight years for this crime. He was formally sentenced on October 27, 2016.

Louisiana and federal
On May 29, 2015, Sharper pleaded guilty, in federal court, to conspiracy to distribute alprazolam, diazepam and zolpidem with intent to commit rape and two counts of distributing these substances with intent to commit rape. He accepted a nine-year sentence in a plea deal for all charges against him. However, on February 18, 2016, U.S. District Judge Jane Triche-Milazzo rejected the deal saying, "This court cannot accept this plea agreement", and noted that a federal pre-sentence report called for a range of 15–20 years. On March 22, 2016, judge Triche-Milazzo approved a new deal under which the proposed length of imprisonment fits the above range.

On August 18, 2016, Sharper was sentenced to 220 months (18 years and 4 months) of incarceration, followed by 3 years of supervised release, and a $20,000 fine. The following week, he was sentenced by a Louisiana State judge to 20 years in prison, stemming from three counts of rape.

All imprisonments will run concurrently, time served will count towards every charge in every state as if running all at the same time. Once out of prison, Sharper must register as a sex offender and comply with a "sex treatment condition", as part of the 3-year supervision program. Court records list the total of 9 victims involved, nationwide. But, according to the judge, there may be as many as 16.

Incarceration 
Sharper is imprisoned in Otisville, New York. He is scheduled to be released in early 2030.

Co-defendants
Two accomplices — Brandon Licciardi of Meraux, Louisiana and Erik Nunez of New Orleans — pleaded guilty in connection with the alleged drug-and-rape plot. Licciardi is a former sheriff's deputy in the New Orleans suburb of St. Bernard Parish. He had been on the force since 2002, but resigned after charges were filed.

On February 27, 2014, Nunez was arrested and charged, in state court, with two counts of aggravated rape purportedly taking place September 23, 2013, at Sharper's residence in New Orleans. Additionally, he was charged with obstruction of justice between September 23, 2013, and February 28, 2014.

On December 12, 2014, Licciardi was indicted by a federal grand jury on six criminal counts including tampering with a witness (2 counts), impeding an investigation, conspiracy to distribute a controlled substance, and
distribution of a controlled substance (2 counts).

On February 6, 2015, Licciardi pleaded innocent to state charges against him, including aggravated rape on February 2, 2013, and three counts of human trafficking to facilitate sexual conduct. Additionally, he was charged with battery using a dangerous weapon.

On July 24, 2015, Nunez was federally charged with conspiracy to impede an investigation. On July 11, 2016, in exchange for a 10-year sentence, he pleaded guilty, before judge Triche-Milazzo, to conspiracy to distribute controlled substances without victim's knowledge and with the intent to commit a sexual battery, to which he entered two separate guilty pleas in a state court of Louisiana. Under Louisiana state law, sexual battery includes touching of the victim's private body parts while the victim is incapable of understanding the nature of the act, and this inability is, or should have been, known to the defendant.

On July 15, 2016, Licciardi pleaded guilty, before the same judge, to conspiracy to distribute controlled substances with the intent to commit crimes of violence, including rape. In state court, he pleaded guilty to three counts of human trafficking and one count of forcible rape. He agreed to a 17-year prison sentence.

On October 20, 2016, both men were formally sentenced by the federal court. On October 27, they were sentenced on Louisiana state charges. Criminal District Judge Karen Herman ordered that each defendant's prison term mirror and run concurrently with his federal sentence.

Analysis
Since February 27, 2014 – Sharper's last day at liberty –  the lingering question was how he managed to hurt at least nine women over many months and still avoid incarceration despite investigation being already underway.

A criminal justice official speculated that the answer may lie in the perpetrator's high social and financial status affording him well-qualified lawyers prosecutors hesitated to confront. "If his name was John Brown, he would have been in jail", the official said. "If a woman says, 'He's the guy that raped me,' and you have corroborating evidence to show they were together and she went to the hospital and she can identify him, that guy goes to jail".

Another official elaborated: "The D.A.'s position and the administration's position was, because this was a high-profile case, we want to make sure we do this the right way. It was mainly because of the celebrity-ness".

Over time, Sharper's actions became more and more sophisticated. He did not make self-incriminating statements. He traveled often. His criminal activity spanned four states, making it hard to detect. Prescription sedatives mixed with alcohol made the victims unconscious and unable to remember, undermining their credibility with the police.

Further proceedings
In July 2019, Sharper filed a motion to undo his 2016 plea deal arguing that he was not adequately advised by his previous lawyers on the consequences of his guilty plea. However, the judge dismissed his motion citing that Sharper had twice admitted in open court that he understood the terms of his plea agreement.

References

External links

 New Orleans Saints profile

1975 births
Living people
21st-century American criminals
African-American players of American football
American football safeties
American male criminals
American people convicted of drug offenses
American people convicted of rape
American people convicted of sexual assault
American prisoners and detainees
American rapists
American sportspeople convicted of crimes
Criminals from Virginia
Green Bay Packers players
Minnesota Vikings players
National Conference Pro Bowl players
National Football League announcers
New Orleans Saints players
Players of American football from Richmond, Virginia
Prisoners and detainees of the United States federal government
Violence against women in the United States
William & Mary Tribe football players